Pike Pike Aye is the Chief Justice of the Supreme Court of Tanintharyi Region of Myanmar.

She previously served as a Justice at Supreme Court of Tanintharyi Region. At 29 January 2018, it was appointed .

References

Burmese judges
Living people
Women chief justices
Year of birth missing (living people)